Francis Walker may refer to:

Francis Walker (Virginia politician) (1764–1806), U.S. Congressman from Virginia
Francis Walker (entomologist) (1809–1874), British entomologist
Francis A. Walker (politician) (1871–1956), Canadian politician in Alberta
Francis Amasa Walker (1840–1897), American economist
Francis S. Walker (1848–1916), Irish painter
Francis Marion Walker (1827–1864), Confederate States Army colonel during the American Civil War
Francis Spring Walker (1876–1941), British Army officer

See also
Frank Walker (disambiguation)